Utricularia asplundii is a small to medium-sized terrestrial or epiphytic, perennial carnivorous plant that belongs to the genus Utricularia. U. asplundii is endemic to western South America and is found in Colombia and Ecuador. It was originally published and described by Peter Taylor in 1975. Specimens cited by Alvaro Fernández-Pérez in 1964 from Colombia as U. jamesoniana were partly U. jamesoniana and partly U. asplundii.

See also 
 List of Utricularia species

References

External links 

Carnivorous plants of South America
Flora of Colombia
Flora of Ecuador
asplundii
Epiphytes